Getting Nowhere Faster is a 2004 American skate video featuring female skateboarders.  The video features skateboarding footage of the world's most prominent female skateboarders, as well as a fiction film called The Skatepark Hauntings of Debbie Escalante.  The skateboarding footage is interwoven with scenes from the video.
The DVD features an option to watch only the skateboarding footage, or the storyline sections of the feature. The video is considered to be a major influence on the progression of women in skateboarding.

Synopsis
Debbie Escalante and her partner, the Cowboy, haunt a skate park, until a group of female skaters leave their dance class to combat Debbie.

Featured skaters
Amy Caron
Vanessa Torres
Lyn-Z Adams Hawkins
Alex White
Kenna Gallagher
Faye Jaime
Lauren Mollica
Van Nguyen
Elizabeth Nitu
Nugget
Stefanie Thomas
Patiane Frietas
Lauren Perkins

Cameos
 Elissa Steamer, Cara-Beth Burnside, Jen O'Brien, Monica Shaw, Lisa Whitaker, Jessie Van Roechoudt, Lacey Baker

DVD bonus features
Bonus skate footage of several skaters
Tour footage
Skate footage from the public
Slideshow

Sponsors
Element Skateboards
Etnies
SG Magazine
PETA2

References

External links

roychristopher.com
 

2004 films
Skateboarding videos
2000s English-language films